Sinopidae ("swift foxes") is a family of extinct predatory mammals from extinct order Hyaenodonta. Fossil remains of these mammals are known from early to middle Eocene deposits in North America, Europe and Asia.

Classification and phylogeny

Taxonomy
 Family: †Sinopidae 
 Genus: †Acarictis 
 †Acarictis ryani 
 (unranked): †Sinopa clade
 Genus: †Prototomus (paraphyletic genus) 
 †Prototomus deimos 
 †Prototomus girardoti 
 †Prototomus martis 
 †Prototomus minimus 
 †Prototomus phobos 
 †Prototomus robustus 
 †Prototomus secundarius 
 †Prototomus viverrinus 
 Genus: †Sinopa 
 †Sinopa jilinia 
 †Sinopa lania 
 †Sinopa longipes 
 †Sinopa major 
 †Sinopa minor 
 †Sinopa piercei 
 †Sinopa pungens 
 †Sinopa rapax 
 †Sinopa sp. A [AMNH FM 11538] 
 Incertae sedis:
 †Sinopidae sp. [FMNH PM 59529]

Phylogeny 
The phylogenetic relationships of family Sinopidae are shown in the following cladogram:

See also
 Mammal classification
 Hyaenodonta

References

Hyaenodonts
Paleogene mammals of North America
Paleogene mammals of Asia
Paleogene mammals of Europe
Prehistoric mammal families